Natalie Moorhead (born Nathalian Morehead,  July 27, 1901 – October 6, 1992) was an American film and stage actress of the 1920s and 1930s. She was known for distinctive platinum blond hair.

Early years
Moorehead grew up in Pittsburgh.

Career 
She began her theatre career on Broadway at the Fulton Theatre playing a bridesmaid in the 1922 play Abie's Irish Rose which broke a record for run of the play, finally closing at the Theatre Republic on October 1, 1927. She then played Sadie in A Lady in Love (1927) at the Lyceum Theatre. She played Lydia Webster in George M. Cohan's 1927 farce Baby Cyclone at Henry Miller's Theatre.

Personal life
On December 21, 1930, Moorhead married director Alan Crosland in Yosemite National Park. She sued him for divorce on July 2, 1935. On March 28, 1942, in Maricopa, Arizona, she married millionaire Robert J. Dunham, the sixty-six year-old president of the Chicago Park District. He died in 1948. Moorhead's fourth husband was Juan Garchitorena, an actor (under the stage name Juan Torena) and former soccer player. They wed on July 27, 1957, in Beverly Hills.

Selected filmography

Thru Different Eyes (1929) - Frances Thornton
The Unholy Night (1929) - Lady Violet Montague
The Girl from Havana (1929) - Lona Martin
The Furies (1930) - Caroline Leigh
The Benson Murder Case (1930) - Fanny Del Roy
Spring Is Here (1930) - Rita Conway
Show Girl in Hollywood (1930) - Blonde Actress with Frank Buelow at Premiere (uncredited)
The Runaway Bride (1930) - Clara Muldoon
Shadow of the Law (1930) - Ethel Barry aka Ethel George
Hot Curves (1930) - Maizie
Manslaughter (1930) - Eleanor Bellington
Ladies Must Play (1930) - Connie
The Office Wife (1930) - Linda Fellowes
Divorce Among Friends (1930) - Joan Whitley
Hook, Line and Sinker (1930) - Duchess Bessie Von Essie
Captain Thunder (1930) - Bonita
Dance, Fools, Dance (1931) - Della
Illicit (1931) - Margie True
Parlor, Bedroom and Bath (1931) - Leila Crofton
Women Men Marry (1931) - Dolly Moulton
My Past (1931) - Consuelo 'Connie' Byrne
The Phantom of Paris (1931) - Vera
Morals for Women (1931) - Flora
The Deceiver (1931) - Mrs. Lawton
Maker of Men (1931) - Mrs. Rhodes
Discarded Lovers (1932) - Irma Gladden
Three Wise Girls (1932) - Ruth Dexter
The Menace (1932) - Caroline Quayle
Cross-Examination (1932) - Inez Wells
Love Bound (1932) - Verna Wilson, alias Vera Wendall
The Stoker (1932) - Vera Martin
The King Murder (1932) - Elizabeth Hawthorn
The Fighting Gentleman (1932) - Violet Reed
Forgotten (1933) - Myrtle Strauss
The Mind Reader (1933) - Mrs. Austin
Private Detective 62 (1933) - Helen Burns
Corruption (1933) - Sylvia Gorman
Dance Hall Hostess (1933) - Clare
The Big Chance (1933) - Babe
Curtain at Eight (1933) - Alma Jenkins Thornton
Gigolettes of Paris (1933) - Diane Valraine
Secret Sinners (1933) - Mrs. Gilbert
Only Yesterday (1933) - Lucy (uncredited)
Long Lost Father (1934) - Phyllis Mersey-Royds
 Dancing Man (1934) - Tamara Trevor
The Thin Man (1934) - Julia Wolf
Fifteen Wives (1934) - Carol Manning
The Curtain Falls (1934) - Katherine Scorsby
Champagne for Breakfast (1935) - Mrs. Morton
Two in a Crowd (1936) - Mrs. Anthony (uncredited)
15 Maiden Lane (1936) - Nellie - Society Crook (uncredited)
What Becomes of the Children? (1936) - Edith Worthington
King of Gamblers (1937) - Woman at Table (uncredited)
The Adventurous Blonde (1937) - Theresa Gray
Heart of Arizona (1938) - Belle Starr
The Beloved Brat (1938) - Evelyn Morgan
Letter of Introduction (1938) - Maud Raleigh - Park Plaza Gossip (uncredited)
When Tomorrow Comes (1939) - Woman (uncredited)
Lady of the Tropics (1939) - Mrs. Hazlitt
The Women (1939) - Woman at Modiste Salon (uncredited)
I Take This Woman (1940) - May - Saleslady (uncredited)
Flight Angels (1940) - Miss Mason
All This, and Heaven Too (1940) - Lady at the Theatre (uncredited)
I Want a Divorce (1940) - Mrs. Tyrell (uncredited)
Margie (1940) - Mrs. Dixon (final film role)

References

External links

 
 

1901 births
1992 deaths
20th-century American actresses
American film actresses
Actresses from Pittsburgh
American stage actresses